World Council of Arameans (Syriacs), previously known as the Syriac Universal Alliance, is an international non-government umbrella organization, whose membership consists of several national associations, representing Arameans (also known as Syriac) from various countries around the world. Position of the SUA/WCA president is regarded as representative within Aramean/Syriac community. Since 2009, the organization is presided by Johny Messo.

Activities 

The organization was founded in on 16 July 1983, in New Jersey, as the Syriac Universal Alliance (SUA), on the initiative of the American Aramaic Association and the Swedish Syriac Federation. It was later joined by several other Aramean organizations from various countries. In 1999, SUA was given a Special Consultative Status by the United Nations Economic and Social Council.

From 1999 to 2002, the organization was presided by Habib Afram (b. 1954), an Aramean/Syriac politician from Lebanon. He was succeeded by Gabriel Marawgeh, an Aramean/Syriac politician from Sweden, who represented SUA at the conference on genocide against Aramean people, held on 6 November 2007 in Brussels, under auspices of the European Parliament.

Under the presidency of Johny Messo (since 2009), the organization intensified its support for the notion of Aramean continuity, and also for the promotion of Arameandom (Oromoyutho), primarily among those who self-identify as Arameans, but some wider concepts are also advocated. On several occasions, representatives of SUA/WCA stated that some other Aramaic-speaking communities of the Near East, such as modern Assyrians and modern Chaldeans, should also be viewed as Arameans, thus advancing a pan-Aramean narrative, that provoked reactions from other communities.

Representatives of SUA/WCA have criticized the policy of Arabization, that was affecting both linguistic and ethnic identity of Arameans and other non-Arab communities in some Arab countries, particularly in Syria.

In 2011, as a result of cooperation between SUA and the Council of Europe, an educational program was initiated, under the name: "1st Aramean Young Leadership Programme: The Road to the Future".
 
In 2012, official name of the organization was changed to World Council of Arameans (Syriacs). New name was adopted in order to emphasize and promote Aramean identity, but traditional Syriac designation was also kept, as a symbol of continuity.

In 2015, WCA had an active role in manifestations commemorating centenary (1915-2015) of genocides committed by the Ottoman Empire against various Christian communities in the Near East.

In 2016, representatives of WCA participated in conference "The Alarming Situation and Persecution of Aramean Christians" that was held on 25 May in Brussels, organized by the European People's Party group of the European Parliament.

WCA delegation participated at the "Third International Conference on the victims of ethnic and religious violence in the Middle East", that was held in Brussels, on 14 May 2018, under auspices of Belgian Ministry of Foreign Affairs.

In 2019, WCA representative Hala Naoum Néhmé, an Aramean politician from the Netherlands, was selected by the UN and appointed by Geir Otto Pedersen (UN Special Envoy for Syria) as one of 50 selected members of the Syrian Constitutional Committee.

Mission 

"The World Council of Arameans (Syriacs) is dedicated to answer the call to protect and secure the rights, liberty and equality of the Aramean people, safeguard and promote the cultural heritage of its ancestors, ensuring justice, and uniting all its people as a self-determined and internationally recognized Aramean nation."

Members of the WCA 

The current member-organizations of WCA are:

 Australia: World Council of Arameans - Australia 
 Austria: Syriac Association of Vienna, in Austria
 Belgium: Federation of Arameans in Belgium (Fédération des Araméens de Belgique)
 Germany: Federation of Arameans in Germany (Bundesverband der Aramäer in Deutschland)
 Netherlands : Federation of Arameans (Suryoye) in the Netherlands (Suryoye Aramese Federatie Nederland)
 Sweden: Syriac Federation of Sweden (Syrianska riksförbundet i Sverige)
 Switzerland: Federation of Arameans (Syriacs) in Switzerland (Föderation der Aramäer in der Schweiz)
 United Kingdom: Aramean Association of the United Kingdom
 United States: Aramaic American Association

See also 
 Aramean diaspora
 Aramean Democratic Organization
 Syriac Assembly Movement

References

Sources

External links 
 World Council of Arameans (Syriacs) - Official website
 WCA Youth Academy - Official Youth Division

Arameans
Ethnic organizations
Organizations established in 1983